1982 is a common year.

1982 may also refer to:

Events
1982 in film
1982 in music
1982 Lebanon War
1982 Commonwealth Games
1982 NFL season

Books
 1982 (book), a memoir written by Canadian radio personality Jian Ghomeshi

Film
 1982 (2013 film), a movie written and directed by Tommy Oliver and starring Hill Harper
 1982 (2019 film), a 2019 Lebanese film by Oualid Mouaness

Music
 1982 (group), an American hip-hop duo composed of producer Statik Selektah and rapper Termanology
 1982 (Statik Selektah and Termanology album)
 1+9+8+2, also known as 1982, an album by rock band Status Quo
 1982 (Foje album) a 1996 album by Lithuanian rock band Foje
 "1982" (Randy Travis song)
 "1982" (Miss Kittin & The Hacker song)
 1982 (The Living Album) - Debut album of the Band The Living, released in 2022.